The 1998 Indiana Hoosiers football team represented Indiana University Bloomington during the 1998 NCAA Division I-A football season. They participated as members of the Big Ten Conference. The Hoosiers played their home games in Memorial Stadium in Bloomington, Indiana. The team was coached by Cam Cameron in his second year as head coach.

Schedule

Roster

References

Indiana
Indiana Hoosiers football seasons
Indiana Hoosiers football